Prosper Désiré "Georges" Péclet (27 July 1897 – 11 January 1974) was a French actor, director, and screenwriter.

Career
Between 1919 and 1957, Péclet played in ninety-five films (including several short films). He was an assistant director in 1927 and then eventually began directing in 1928.

He was a director of ten films in total, the last one being from 1963. He was also the writer of five of these movies and producer of one. Péclet is sometimes credited simply by his name, occasionally spelled without the accent: "Peclet".

Selected filmography
 The Man with the Hispano (1926)
 The Martyrdom of Saint Maxence (1928)
 Napoleon at Saint Helena (1929)
 The Mystery of the Villa Rose (1930)
 The Train of Suicides (1931)
 Moon Over Morocco (1931)
 The Regiment's Champion (1932)
 The Five Accursed Gentlemen (1932)
 Imperial Violets (1932)
 The Last Night (1934)
 Princess Tam Tam (1935)
 27 Rue de la Paix (1936)
 The King (1936)
 The Men Without Names (1937)
 Cristobal's Gold (1940)
 The Midnight Sun (1943)
 Le Grand Cirque (1950)

References

Georges Péclet (list of films) at "Ciné-Ressources"

External links

1974 deaths
1897 births
French male film actors
French male silent film actors
French film directors
French male screenwriters
20th-century French screenwriters
People from Alpes-de-Haute-Provence
20th-century French male actors
20th-century French male writers